Trisulia is a village and an important road intersection between Bhubaneswar and Cuttack in the Indian state of Odisha. The 2.88km long Netaji Subhash Chandra Bose Bridge which connects the twin cities of Bhubaneswar and Cuttack starts from Trisulia.

References

Villages in Cuttack district